Chris Bennett is an American jazz singer and songwriter.

Bennett was born in Marshall, Illinois. She graduated from the University of Illinois.

She has collaborated with Tina Turner, The Manhattan Transfer, Giorgio Moroder, Donna Summer, The Three Degrees, Sparks and Keb Mo. Bennett's Grammy nomination was for "The Theme from Midnight Express", her contribution to the Midnight Express movie soundtrack. Bennett's 2010 album Sail Away - The Tahiti Sessions was produced by Bennett and Eric Doney and recorded on the island of Tahiti. The album includes a live string ensemble.

Discography
 Love's in You, Love's in Me with Giorgio Moroder (Casablanca, 1978)
 A Whiter Shade of Pale by Munich Machine with Chris Bennett (Casablanca, 1978)
 Chris Bennett (Beachwood, 1993)
 Less Is More (Chartmaker, 1998)
 Live in Berlin (Renegade, 2000)
 Until the End of Time (Rhombus, 2001)
 When I Think of Christmas (Rhombus, 2003)
 Once Upon a Time: Live at the A-Trane (Renegade, 2005)
 Chris Bennett on Broadway (Rhombus, 2005)
 Girl Talk (Chris Bennett, 2008)
 Sail Away (Renegade, 2012)
 Something Wonderful with Bill Marx (2018)

References

External links
 Official site
 JazzTimes review of Sail Away

1948 births
Living people
Dancers from Illinois
Jazz musicians from Illinois
People from Marshall, Illinois
Singer-songwriters from Illinois
American female dancers
American women jazz singers
American women singer-songwriters
American jazz singers
21st-century American women